Anwar Mohamed may refer to:
 Anwar Mohamed (athlete)
 Anwar Mohamed (taekwondo)